Asmarino or Asmarino Independent Media is an Eritrean diaspora news website created in 1997.

Creation
Asmarino was created in 1997 by Tesfaledet, an Eritrean refugee living in the United States, after a visit to Eritrea in which he failed to convince officials of his proposals for internet development in Eritrea. By 2010s, the website was widely seen as a major news site of the Eritrean diaspora.

Points of view
The content of Asmarino tends to be critical of the Eritrean government, playing a "counterpart to the Eritrean state".

Repression
In 2011, one of Asmarino's authors, Meron Estefanos, was threatened by Tedros Isaac with having her throat cut if she continued to report about his brother Dawit Isaac, who at the time had been imprisoned for ten years without charge or trial.

References

External links

Mass media in Eritrea